Gusmão (sometimes Gusmao) is a Portuguese surname of ancient Spanish toponymic origin from the village of Guzmán in the Spanish region of Burgos.

It may refer to:
Alexandre de Gusmão, Portuguese-Brazilian diplomat.
Artur Guilherme Moraes Gusmão, Brazilian footballer.
Bartolomeu de Gusmão, Portuguese-Brazilian jesuit priest and scientist.
Guilherme Milhomem Gusmão, Brazilian footballer.
Kirsty Sword Gusmão, Australian wife of Xanana Gusmão.
Luísa de Gusmão, Queen of Portugal by marriage.
Paulo César Gusmão, Brazilian footballer.
Rebeca Gusmão, Brazilian swimmer.
Xanana Gusmão, East Timorese politician.

See also
Guzmán, the Spanish variant.

References

Surnames
Portuguese-language surnames
Toponymic surnames